USS Preston (DD-327) was a  built for the United States Navy during World War I.

Description
The Clemson class was a repeat of the preceding  although more fuel capacity was added. They had a crew of 6 officers and 108 enlisted men.

Performance differed radically between the ships of the class, often due to poor workmanship. The Clemson class was powered by two steam turbines, each driving one propeller shaft, using steam provided by four water-tube boilers.

The ships were armed with four 4-inch (102 mm) guns in single mounts and were fitted with two  1-pounder guns for anti-aircraft defense. In many ships a shortage of 1-pounders caused them to be replaced by 3-inch (76 mm) guns. Their primary weapon, though, was their torpedo battery of a dozen 21 inch (533 mm) torpedo tubes in four triple mounts. They also carried a pair of depth charge rails. A "Y-gun" depth charge thrower was added to many ships.

Construction and career

Preston, named for Samuel W. Preston, was laid down 19 July 1919 by the Bethlehem Shipbuilding Corporation, San Francisco, California; launched 7 August 1920; sponsored by Mrs. Addie Worth Bagley Daniels, wife of the Secretary of the Navy; and commissioned 13 April 1921. Following shakedown, the flush-decked destroyer remained on the west coast on temporary duty. Until December 1921, she conducted exercises out of San Diego, California, then got underway for assignment with the Atlantic Fleet Destroyer Force. With that force for most of her naval career, she operated along the east coast, regularly sailing south for winter exercises in the Caribbean. In June 1925 she interrupted that schedule for a tour with US Naval Forces in European Waters. On that tour she cruised from the waters off Scandinavia to the Mediterranean. In July 1926, she returned to New York and resumed her former schedule of east coast and Caribbean employment.

Fate
Preston was decommissioned at Philadelphia 1 May 1930 and was assigned to the Norfolk Navy Yard for strength tests. Her name was struck from the Navy List 6 November 1931 and on 23 August 1932 her hull was sold for scrap.

Notes

References

External links
http://www.navsource.org/archives/05/327.htm

 

Clemson-class destroyers
Ships built in San Francisco
1920 ships